(For a detailed description see Cache coherency protocols (examples))

In computing, MOESI is a full cache coherency protocol that encompasses all of the possible states commonly used in other protocols.  In addition to the four common MESI protocol states, there is a fifth "Owned" state representing data that is both modified and shared.  This avoids the need to write modified data back to main memory before sharing it.  While the data must still be written back eventually, the write-back may be deferred.

In order for this to be possible, direct cache-to-cache transfers of data must be possible, so a cache with the data in the modified state can supply that data to another reader without transferring it to memory.

As discussed in AMD64 Architecture Programmer's Manual Vol. 2 'System Programming', each cache line is in one of five states:

Modified This cache has the only valid copy of the cache line, and has made changes to that copy.

OwnedThis cache is one of several with a valid copy of the cache line, but has the exclusive right to make changes to it—other caches may read but not write the cache line.  When this cache changes data on the cache line, it must broadcast those changes to all other caches sharing the line. The introduction of the Owned state allows dirty sharing of data, i.e., a modified cache block can be moved around various caches without updating main memory. The cache line may be changed to the Modified state after invalidating all shared copies, or changed to the Shared state by writing the modifications back to main memory. Owned cache lines must respond to a snoop request with data.

Exclusive  This cache has the only copy of the line, but the line is clean (unmodified).

SharedThis line is one of several copies in the system.  This cache does not have permission to modify the copy (another cache can be in the "owned" state). Other processors in the system may hold copies of the data in the Shared state, as well.  Unlike the MESI protocol, a shared cache line may be dirty with respect to memory; if it is, some cache has a copy in the Owned state, and that cache is responsible for eventually updating main memory.  If no cache holds the line in the Owned state, the memory copy is up to date.  The cache line may not be written, but may be changed to the Exclusive or Modified state after invalidating all shared copies.  (If the cache line was Owned before, the invalidate response will indicate this, and the state will become Modified, so the obligation to eventually write the data back to memory is not forgotten.)  It may also be discarded (changed to the Invalid state) at any time. Shared cache lines may not respond to a snoop request with data.

Invalid This block is not valid; it must be fetched to satisfy any attempted access.

For any given pair of caches, the permitted states of a given cache line are as follows:

(The order in which the states are normally listed serves only to make the acronym "MOESI" pronounceable.)

This protocol, a more elaborate version of the simpler MESI protocol (but not in extended MESI - see Cache coherency), avoids the need to write a dirty cache line back to main memory when another processor tries to read it.  Instead, the Owned state allows a processor to supply the modified data directly to the other processor.  This is beneficial when the communication latency and bandwidth between two CPUs is significantly better than to main memory.  An example would be multi-core CPUs with per-core L2 caches.

While MOESI can quickly share dirty cache lines from cache, it cannot quickly share clean lines from cache. If a cache line is clean with respect to memory and in the shared state, then any snoop request to that cache line will be filled from memory, rather than a cache.

If a processor wishes to write to an Owned cache line, it must notify the other processors that are sharing that cache line.  Depending on the implementation it may simply tell them to invalidate their copies (moving its own copy to the Modified state), or it may tell them to update their copies with the new contents (leaving its own copy in the Owned state).

See also
 Cache coherency
 MSI protocol
 MESI protocol
 MOSI protocol
 MESIF protocol

References 

Cache coherency
Cache (computing)